This list includes places in Great Britain (including neighbouring islands such as the Isle of Man), some of which were part of the Roman Empire, or were later given Latin place names in historical references.

Background
Until the Modern Era, Latin was the common language for scholarship and mapmaking. During the nineteenth and twentieth centuries, German scholars in particular have made significant contributions to the study of historical place names, or Ortsnamenkunde. These studies have, in turn, contributed to the study of genealogy. For genealogists and historians of pre-Modern Europe, knowing alternative names of places is vital to extracting information from both public and private records. Even specialists in this field point out, however, that the information can be easily taken out of context, since there is a great deal of repetition of place names throughout Europe; reliance purely on apparent connections should therefore be tempered with valid historical methodology.

Caveats and notes
Latin place names are not always exclusive to one place — for example, there were several Roman cities whose names began with Colonia and then a more descriptive term.  During the Middle Ages, these were often shortened to just Colonia. One of these, Colonia Agrippinensis, retains the name today in the form of Cologne (from French, German Köln).

Early sources for Roman names show numerous variants and spellings of the Latin names.

The modern canonical name is listed first.  In general, only the earliest source is shown for each name, although many of the names are recorded in more than one of the sources.  Where the source differs in spelling, or has other alternatives, these are listed following the source.  As an aid to searching, variants are spelled completely, and listed in most likely chronology.

Cities and towns in England

Cities and towns in Scotland

Cities and towns in Wales

Island names

Region or country names

See also
 List of Roman place names in Britain
 List of Latin place names used as specific names

References

Sources
In order of likely publication:

TA: Tacitus (Gaius Cornelius Tacitus), Agricola
PNH: Pliny (Gaius Plinius Secundus), Naturalis Historia; book "PNH" chapter (that is, "37PNH81" instead of the usual "N.H.xxxvii.81").
PG: Ptolemy (Claudius Ptolemaeus), Geographia; book "PG" chapter (that is, "2PG3" instead of the usual "II.3"). Ptolemy wrote in Greek, so names are transliterated back into Latin to reveal the original form.
AI: Antonine Itinerary
ND: Notitia Dignitatum
RC: Ravenna Cosmography, Ravennatis Anonymi Cosmographia
BSH: Buchanan, George (1506–1582): Rerum Scoticarum Historia (1582)
HLU: Hofmann, Johann Jacob (1635–1706): Lexicon Universale
GOL: The standard reference to Latin placenames, with their modern equivalents, is Dr. J. G. Th. Grässe, Orbis Latinus : Lexikon lateinischer geographischer Namen des Mittelalters und der Neuzeit (1861), an exhaustive work of meticulous German scholarship that is available on-line in the second edition of 1909. To use it, one must understand German names of countries, as they were in 1909. The original was re-edited and expanded in a multi-volume edition in 1972.
A.L.F. Rivet and Colin Smith, The place-names of Roman Britain, London, 1979 (reprinted by Book Club Associates, 1981).

External links 
Antonine Itinerary
Buchanan, Rerum Scoticarum Historia
Grässe, Orbis Latinus
Grässe, Orbis Latinus
Historical Directories, England and Wales, from 1750 to 1919
Hofmann: Lexicon Universale
Notitia Dignitatum: The British Section
Pliny the Elder: the Natural History
Ptolemy: the Geography
Roman Map of Britain
Tacitus: Agricola (English)
List of Latin placenames in Britain

Latin in Britain
Latin place names
Britain
Latin, Britain
Britain
Latin names
Latin place names